Doğanhisar is a town and district of Konya Province in the Central Anatolia region of Turkey. According to 2000 census, population of the district is 36,162 of which 9,756 live in the town of Doğanhisar.

Notes

References

External links
 District governor's official website 
 District municipality's official website 

Populated places in Konya Province
Districts of Konya Province